Rubén Roberto Paredes Vera (born 28 September 1955 in Asunción, Paraguay) is a former centre back.

Honours

Club
 Olimpia
 Paraguayan Primera División: 1979, 1980, 1981, 1982
 Copa Libertadores: 1979
Copa Interamericana: 1979
Intercontinental Cup: 1979

Titles

References

External links
 .

1955 births
Living people
Paraguayan footballers
Paraguayan expatriate footballers
Paraguay international footballers
Copa América-winning players
1979 Copa América players
Club Sol de América footballers
Cruz Azul footballers
Atlético Tembetary footballers
Club Olimpia footballers
Atlético Nacional footballers
Deportivo Pereira footballers
Barcelona S.C. footballers
Expatriate footballers in Colombia
Expatriate footballers in Mexico
Paraguayan expatriate sportspeople in Mexico
Association football defenders